The A468 is a principal road from Newport to Nantgarw. The current route begins at the A467 in Bassaleg then passes through Rhiwderin, Machen, Trethomas, Bedwas and Caerphilly, terminating on the A470.

History
Originally the A468 began at the Handpost Pub on the junction with the former A467 (reclassified to B4240) and proceeded west along Bassaleg Road, passing under a pair of stone arch bridges carrying the Ebbw Valley Railway and the Brecon and Merthyr Railway before reaching the current starting point.

References

Roads in Caerphilly County Borough
Roads in Newport, Wales
Roads in Rhondda Cynon Taf